The New Guinean jumping mouse (Lorentzimys nouhuysi) is a species of rodent in the family Muridae.
It is found in West Papua, Indonesia and Papua New Guinea.

References
 Baillie, J. 1996.  Lorentzimys nouhuysi.   2006 IUCN Red List of Threatened Species.   Downloaded on 19 July 2007.

Old World rats and mice
Mammals of Western New Guinea
Rodents of Papua New Guinea
Rodents of Indonesia
Mammals described in 1911
Taxa named by Fredericus Anna Jentink
Taxonomy articles created by Polbot
Rodents of New Guinea